Ephysteris wenquana is a moth in the family Gelechiidae. It was described by H.H.Li and Bidzilya in 2008. It is found in Yunnan, China.

The length of the forewings is 4-4.5 mm. The forewings are covered with pale brown scales, sparsely mottled by black in the apical zone and with three dark weakly prolonged spots. The first at one-third, the second at two-thirds and the third in the middle near the costal margin. The hindwings are pale grey. Adults are on wing in August.

Etymology
The species name refers to Wenquan, the type locality.

References

Ephysteris
Moths described in 2008